Márta Giba (born 1943) is a former Hungarian handball player and World champion, who was voted the Hungarian Handballer of the Year in 1971.

A one-team player, Giba played for Ferencvárosi TC between 1962 and 1979, during which period she won three Hungarian championships and as many Hungarian cup titles. She also obtained EHF Cup Winners' Cup in 1978.

She played 68 times for the Hungarian national team; with them she triumphed at the 1965 World Championship and won the bronze medal of the 1971 and 1973 edition.

Achievements
Nemzeti Bajnokság I:
Winner: 1968, 1969, 1971
Magyar Kupa:
Winner: 1967, 1970, 1977
European Champions Cup:
Finalist: 1971
Cup Winners' Cup:
Winner: 1978
Finalist: 1979
World Championship:
Winner: 1965
Bronze Medalist: 1971, 1973

Individual awards
 Hungarian Handballer of the Year: 1971

References

 Kozák, Péter (1995). Ki kicsoda a magyar sportéletben?: (A–H). Szekszárd: Babits Kiadó. .

1943 births
Living people
Handball players from Budapest
Hungarian female handball players